Hélène Simard (born 29 October 1965) is a retired Canadian wheelchair basketball and wheelchair tennis player who competed in international level events. She has competed at the Paralympic Games three times. Simard won a gold medal in wheelchair basketball at the 1992 Summer Paralympics.

References

External links
 
 

1965 births
Living people
People from Baie-Comeau
Sportspeople from Quebec
Paralympic wheelchair basketball players of Canada
Paralympic wheelchair tennis players of Canada
Wheelchair basketball players at the 1992 Summer Paralympics
Wheelchair tennis players at the 2000 Summer Paralympics
Wheelchair tennis players at the 2004 Summer Paralympics
Medalists at the 1992 Summer Paralympics
Paralympic medalists in wheelchair basketball
Paralympic gold medalists for Canada
Racket sportspeople from Quebec